The 2021–22 Merrimack Warriors men's basketball team represented Merrimack College in the 2021–22 NCAA Division I men's basketball season. The Warriors, led by fourth-year head coach Joe Gallo, played their home games at Hammel Court in North Andover, Massachusetts as members of the Northeast Conference. They finished the season 14–16, 10–8 in NEC play to finish in fourth place. 

The Warriors, in their third year of a transition to Division I, were ineligible for the NEC tournament and the NCAA tournament. They received an invitation to play in The Basketball Classic, formerly known as the CollegeInsider.com Tournament, but their opponent, UMBC, withdrew from the tournament and the Warriors were unable to play as a result.

Previous season
In a season limited due to the ongoing COVID-19 pandemic, the Warriors finished their conference-only schedule for the 2020–21 season 9–9 in NEC play to finish in a tie for fifth place. As they were in the third year of their four year transition from Division II to Division I, they were ineligible to participate in the NEC tournament.

Roster

Schedule and results
NEC COVID-19 policy provided that if a team could not play a conference game due to COVID-19 issues within its program, the game would be declared a forfeit and the other team would receive a conference win. However, wins related to COVID-19 do not count pursuant to NCAA policy.

|-
!colspan=12 style=| Non-conference regular season

|-
!colspan=12 style=| NEC regular season

|-
!colspan=12 style=| The Basketball Classic

Sources

References

Merrimack Warriors men's basketball seasons
Merrimack Warriors
Merrimack Warriors men's basketball
Merrimack Warriors men's basketball
Merrimack